William Charles Whitting (9 July 1884 – 26 October 1936) was an Australian cricketer. He played one first-class match for New South Wales in 1905/06.

See also
 List of New South Wales representative cricketers

References

External links
 

1884 births
1936 deaths
Australian cricketers
New South Wales cricketers
Cricketers from Sydney